Victoria Curzon-Price (born 1942) was Professor of Economics at the University of Geneva and also at the European Institute (also of the University of Geneva). She holds a PhD from the Graduate Institute of International Studies in Geneva. Her areas of interest include international trade, economic integration, institutional competition and political economy. Previously she was president of the Mont Pelèrin Society, from 2004–2006. She currently sits on the Board of Trustees of the Liberales Institut and is a member of the Institut Constant de Rebecque.

Her son is Tony Curzon Price.

References

External links
 Global Studies Institute – Global Studies Institute – UNIGE
  

Swiss economists
Swiss women economists

Academic staff of the University of Geneva
Swiss libertarians
Libertarian economists
1942 births
Living people
Graduate Institute of International and Development Studies alumni
Member of the Mont Pelerin Society